The ashy starling (Lamprotornis unicolor) is a species of starling in the family Sturnidae. It is found in Kenya and Tanzania.  It is alternatively placed in the genus Cosmopsarus or Spreo.

References

BirdLife International 2004.  Cosmopsarus unicolor. 2006 IUCN Red List of Threatened Species. Downloaded on 24 July 2007.

ashy starling
ashy starling
Birds of East Africa
ashy starling
ashy starling
Taxonomy articles created by Polbot